As of January 2023, Gulf Air flies to the following destinations from its hub at Bahrain International Airport.

List

References

Lists of airline destinations